Bankya is a village in Tran Municipality in western Bulgaria. The village located next to the border with Serbia. One house in Bankya is even split down the middle by the border. Bankya has an area of 5.651 km2 and a population of 16 people.

Villages in Pernik Province